This article lists the largest companies in South Africa in terms of their revenue, net profit, total assets and market capitalization according to the American business magazine Forbes.

2019 Forbes list 

This list is based on the Forbes Global 2000, which ranks the world's 2,000 largest publicly traded companies. The Forbes list takes into account a multitude of factors, including the revenue, net profit, total assets and market value of each company; each factor is given a weighted rank in terms of importance when considering the overall ranking. The table below also lists the headquarters location and industry sector of each company. The figures are in billions of US dollars and are for the year 2019. All 14 companies from South Africa in the Forbes 2000 are listed.

*Despite the company being South African with Head Offices in South Africa, the company is listed as British by the Forbes 2000 ranking due to the entity's registered address in London.

See also 

 List of companies of South Africa
 List of largest companies by revenue

References 

South Africa
 
companies